Bank of Maine Ice Vault is an indoor ice arena located in Hallowell, Maine.  It is the home of the Maine Moose ice hockey team which plays in the Northern States Junior Hockey League, and the Skating Association of Maine.

The arena stands on the site of a prior arena, called the Kennebec Ice Arena.  It was built in 1973 and collapsed under the weight of snow on March 2, 2011.

The Maine Moose played their first home game in the new arena against the New York Aviators on October 19, 2012.

References

External links
 

Sports venues completed in 2012
Indoor ice hockey venues in Maine
Buildings and structures in Hallowell, Maine
2012 establishments in Maine
Sports in Kennebec County, Maine